Journey Back To Oz is a 1972 American animated adventure musical fantasy film produced by Filmation. It is loosely based on L. Frank Baum's second Oz novel The Marvelous Land of Oz (1904), although Baum received no screen credit.

The film was not a hit in theaters, but did well on television, premiering on ABC on December 5, 1976. For television broadcast, Filmation produced live-action segments with a celebrity playing the Wizard, flying in his balloon with a parrot and two Munchkins, Sprig and Twig.

The first version featured Bill Cosby. Filmation only contracted with Cosby for two airings, so when the film aired in syndication later, the company reshot the live segments with Milton Berle. The Cosby-hosted version would eventually air in syndication.

Plot
After a tornado in Kansas causes a loose gate to knock Dorothy unconscious, she re-appears in the Land of Oz with Toto, and encounters a talking Signpost (voiced by Jack E. Leonard), whose three signs point in different directions, all marked "Emerald City". They later meet Pumpkinhead (voiced by Paul Lynde), the unwilling servant of antagonist Mombi – cousin of the deceased Wicked Witches of the East and West. Toto chases a cat to a small cottage where Dorothy is captured by Mombi's pet crow (voiced by Mel Blanc) and Mombi (voiced by Ethel Merman) herself. Pumpkinhead sneaks into the house in Mombi's absence, and discovers her creation of green elephants, to use as her army to conquer the Emerald City. Pumpkinhead frees Dorothy, and they flee. After finding Dorothy gone, Mombi threatens that their warning the Scarecrow will not help when her green elephants "come crashing through the gate".

Dorothy and Pumpkinhead acquire Woodenhead Stallion III (voiced by Herschel Bernardi), a former merry-go-round horse (a combination of the Sawhorse from The Marvelous Land of Oz and the title character of the last Oz book of all, Merry Go Round in Oz), who takes them to the Emerald City, where Dorothy warns the Scarecrow (voiced by Mickey Rooney) about Mombi's green elephants. Mombi arrives moments later, and Toto and the Scarecrow are captured. Dorothy, Pumpkinhead, and Woodenhead flee to Tinland to convince the Tin Man (voiced by Danny Thomas, who spoke, and Larry Storch, who sang) to help them. He declines upon being afraid of the green elephants and suggests that they ask the Cowardly Lion (voiced by Milton Berle), who promises to slay the elephants, but suggests consulting Glinda the Good Witch (voiced by Rise Stevens), who appears to them with a "Glinda Bird" that uses its Tattle Tail to show what is occurring at the palace. She then gives Dorothy a little silver box, to open only in the Emerald City, and only in a dire emergency.

Mombi, having seen their progress in her crystal ball, brings the nearby trees to life; whereupon Glinda sends a golden hatchet to Pumpkinhead. One of the trees snatches it from him, but changes its fellows and itself into gold and turns them from bad to good. Woodenhead carries Dorothy and Pumpkinhead back to the Emerald City, where Mombi's elephants surprise them. When Dorothy opens Glinda's box, mice emerge, scaring the elephants. Mombi brews a potion to shrink Toto to mouse-size so she can feed him to her cat; but when startled, miniaturizes her crow and cat instead. Thereafter Mombi disguises herself as a rose with poisonous thorns, which the elephants trample over and themselves disappear, prompting the Scarecrow to explain that Mombi's magic has died with her. Unfortunately, Pumpkinhead, another product of Mombi, also dies; however, he is revived by one of Dorothy's tears.

The Scarecrow makes Woodenhead the head of the Oz cavalry and knights Pumpkinhead; and Dorothy and Toto leave Oz by another tornado (created by Pumpkinhead and Glinda), promising to return.

Cast

Production history
Production of Journey Back to Oz began in 1962, but Filmation ran out of money and the unfinished film was shelved for nearly eight years. It was only after the Filmation studio had made profits on their numerous television series that it was finally able to complete the project, copyrighted 1971, released in 1972 in the UK and 1974 in the U.S. The film features Liza Minnelli as the voice of Dorothy (played in the 1939 film by her mother Judy Garland, and in what would have been her first major role had the film been released as originally intended). Other voices were by Mickey Rooney (a former co-star and lifelong friend of Garland's), Milton Berle, Ethel Merman, Paul Lynde, Herschel Bernardi, Paul Ford, Danny Thomas, Margaret Hamilton (also from the 1939 film, but now playing Aunt Em rather than the Wicked Witch of the West), and Metropolitan Opera  mezzo-soprano Risë Stevens as Glinda the Good Witch.

For the film's U.S. release, Filmation partnered with a company called Seymour Borde and distributed it through a process called four wall distribution, whereupon the studio rented venues to show it and kept all of the box-office revenue. Outside the United States and Canada, Warner Bros. distributed the film.

Music
The film contains twelve original songs by Sammy Cahn and Jimmy Van Heusen. The arrangements and some of the film's score was by Walter Scharf.  The original songs (which were featured on a soundtrack album released around the time of the film's television release) include the following:

However, a majority of the film contains library music from other sources. One particular piece of music, heard in the opening titles, is The Awakening, a Johnny Pearson composition that was recorded in 1967 (three years after production on this film began). While largely familiar to U.S. audiences for its use in this film, it is otherwise known to British viewers as the theme for ITN's News at Ten. Coincidentally, another well-known Pearson composition, "Heavy Action" (also known as the theme of Monday Night Football), served as the theme to the syndicated SFM Holiday Network, which ran this film for many years.

Television version

While Journey Back to Oz was a financial failure in its original theatrical release, the film eventually found an audience through repeated showings on television. Filmation sold the TV broadcast rights to ABC in 1976.  By this time, Bill Cosby was in the midst of his success with Filmation's TV series Fat Albert and the Cosby Kids, as well as starring in a new, but short-lived variety series for ABC, Cos.  Filmation decided to expand and reformat the film to a Christmas television special.  The film's theatrical running time was extended to include new live-action connecting segments with Cosby as the Wizard, a character otherwise not seen in the original theatrical release.  The live-action subplot was to get two lost Munchkins home to spend Christmas with Dorothy, while helping to move the plot along.  This extended TV version would later air in a successful syndication run via the aforementioned SFM Holiday Network. The last known broadcast of this Christmas version was in 1984 and has not been available since. SFM also produced another television version minus the holiday tie-in for broadcast during the rest of the year. New live-action sequences for this version were filmed featuring cast member Milton Berle, replacing the Bill Cosby segments.

DVD release
A special edition DVD was released on October 24, 2006. This DVD features a feature-length audio commentary, interviews with creators Lou Scheimer, Hal Sutherland and Fred Ladd, behind the scenes photo gallery, image galleries featuring poster art and animation cels, a sing-a-long feature, most of the Bill Cosby interstitials used in the TV version (presented separately from the original theatrical version contained on the disc and sourced from an incomplete PAL transfer of the TV version, as a complete version of the latter cut was unavailable), the first draft script and storyboards, and a photo gallery (mostly containing behind-the-scenes photos of the Cosby and Berle live-action interstitials used in syndicated broadcasts).

The theatrical version is known only to exist as a PAL digital transfer (sped up 4% from its original film speed) as the original film elements were apparently discarded and purposely destroyed by the previous owner of the film, Hallmark Entertainment.

See also
 List of American films of 1972

References

External links
 
 

1972 animated films
1972 films
1970s American animated films
American children's animated adventure films
American children's animated fantasy films
Animated adventure films
Animated films based on The Wizard of Oz
Animated films based on children's books
Filmation animated films
American films with live action and animation
Films about witchcraft
1970s children's animated films
The Wizard of Oz (1939 film)
Films scored by Walter Scharf
Animated films directed by Hal Sutherland
1970s English-language films
Animated films about lions
Films produced by Lou Scheimer